The Ferris State Bulldogs men's ice hockey team is an NCAA Division I college ice hockey program that represents Ferris State University. The Bulldogs are a member of the Central Collegiate Hockey Association (CCHA). They play at Ewigleben Arena in Big Rapids, Michigan.

History 
Ferris State's ice hockey program began in 1975 as a member of the NAIA and joined the CCHA as an affiliate member. In the program's four seasons in the NAIA the team compiled an overall record of 58-40-1-.591, including three seasons above .700 winning percentage and a program best winning percentage of .795 in the 1976–77 season. The program moved up to NCAA Division I status and became a full member of the CCHA in 1979.  They joined the WCHA in 2013  before returning to the CCHA prior to the 2021–22 season.

Ferris State turned in its best season performance ever in the program's NCAA Division I history for the 2002-03 campaign with a school-best 31-10-1 overall record. The Ferris Bulldogs also claimed their first-ever CCHA Regular-Season Championship title with a first-place 22-5-1 league mark. Ferris State received an at-large bid to the 2003 NCAA Tournament and beat North Dakota 5-2 and advanced to the West Regional title game in their initial NCAA Tourney appearance, before losing a high scoring game to Minnesota 4–7. FSU also earned the distinction of being the nation's first team to reach the 30-win plateau in 2002-03 and also competed in the CCHA Super Six Championship Tourney for the first time since 1993.

The 2011–12 season was historic for the Ferris State ice hockey program. The Bulldogs began the season on a six-game win streak, their best start to a season since 1979-80 when The Bulldogs recorded an eight-game streak. The team ended the regular season with their first CCHA Regular Season Championship since the program's first in 2002–03. The season was highlighted by a 14-game unbeaten streak from January 6, 2012, to February 25 in which the team recorded 11 wins and 4 ties. The Bulldogs were also ranked first in the NCAA men's ice hockey poll for a two-week period in the season for the first time in school history. After the team finished with the top record in the CCHA, the Bulldogs received a first round bye for the 2012 CCHA Tournament. Ferris State played Bowling Green in the second round, after the Falcons upset Northern Michigan. In the best-of-three series, the Falcons picked up a win in overtime in the opening game followed by goal outburst in the second game that saw Ferris State even the series with a 7–4 win. In the final game of the series, Ferris State was unable to hold on to a three-goal lead as BGSU rallied back to force overtime. 
The Falcons scored in the extra period to win the CCHA quarterfinal series. Despite the loss in the CCHA playoffs, the Bulldogs received an at-large bid to the 2012 NCAA Tournament. Ferris State defeated Denver and Cornell in the first two rounds of the tournament with a pair of 2-1 games. In the program's first appearance in the Frozen Four, the Bulldogs defeated Union 3-1 and advanced to the championship game against Boston College. Ferris State was unable to stop the Eagles' offense en route to BC's third title in five seasons. The team finished with a record of 26-12-5.

Season-by-season results

Source:

Coaches
The team has been coached by Bob Daniels since 1992.  Daniels is a two-time recipient of the Spencer Penrose Award, awarded by the American Hockey Coaches Association to the NCAA men's ice hockey coach of the year, having won the award in 2003 and 2012. In 2012, he was also named the Central Collegiate Hockey Association coach of the year after he led the Bulldogs to their first appearance in the Frozen Four and NCAA championship game. Daniels is the longest tenured coach of the Bulldogs and is the only coach in program history to record over 300 wins.

As of completion of 2022–23 season

† Esdale replaced Bertrand in January 1986.

Awards and honors

NCAA 

Spencer Penrose Award
Bob Daniels: 2003, 2012

AHCA First Team All-Americans

1993-94: John Gruden, D
2002-03: Mike Brown, G; Chris Kunitz, F
2010-11: Pat Nagle, G
2011-12: Taylor Nelson, G

AHCA Second Team All-Americans

1995-96: Andy Roach, D
1996-97: Andy Roach, D
2001-02: Rob Collins, F
2010-11: Zach Redmond, D
2011-12: Chad Billins, D

WCHA

Individual awards

Rookie of the Year
 Corey Mackin, F: 2016
 Cooper Zech, F: 2019

Defensive Player of the Year
 Aaron MacKenzie, 2003
 Ryan Caldwell, 2004
 Matt Carle, 2006

Scoring Champion
 Gerald Mayhew, F: 2017

Student-Athlete of the Year
 Chad McDonald, F: 2017

Coach of the Year
 Bob Daniels: 2014

Most Valuable Player in Tournament
 Darren Smith, G: 2016

All-WCHA
First Team All-WCHA

 2013–14: C. J. Motte, G
 2016–17: Gerald Mayhew, F
 2018–19: Cooper Zech, D

Second Team All-WCHA

 2013–14: Scott Czarnowczan, D; Garrett Thompson, F
 2015–16: Gerald Mayhew, F

Third Team All-WCHA

 2013–14: Jason Binkley, D
 2014–15: C. J. Motte, G
 2015–16: Brandon Anselmini, D
 2016–17: Justin Kapelmaster, G
 2017–18: Ryker Killins, D

WCHA All-Rookie Team

 2013–14: Kyle Schempp, F
 2015–16: Corey Mackin, F
 2018–19: Cooper Zech, D
 2019–20: Jake Willets, D

CCHA

Individual awards

Player of the Year
 Chris Kunitz: 2003

Rookie of the Year
 John DePourcq: 1988
 Bradley Marek: 2022

Best Offensive Defenseman
 John Gruden: 1994
 Andy Roach: 1996

Terry Flanagan Memorial Award
 Craig Lisko: 1994
 Aaron Lewicki: 2010

Perani Cup
 Mike Brown: 2003
 Aaron Lewicki: 2010

Scholar-Athlete of the Year
 Chad Billins: 2012

Coach of the Year
 Bob Daniels: 2003, 2012

All-CCHA
First Team All-CCHA

 1979–80: Jim Baker, F
 1979–80: Jim File, D; George Harrison, D
 1981–82: Jim File, D
 1993–94: John Gruden, D
 1995–96: Andy Roach, D
 1996–97: Andy Roach, D
 1998–99: Paul Comrie, F
 2001–02: Chris Kunitz, F; Rob Collins, F
 2002–03: Mike Brown, G; Chris Kunitz, F
 2010–11: Pat Nagle, G; Zach Redmond, D
 2011–12: Taylor Nelson, G; Chad Billins, D

Second Team All-CCHA

 1979–80: Paul Pickard, D
 1983–84: Jim File, D; Randy Merrifield, F
 1990–91: Rod Taylor, F
 1994–95: Andy Roach, D
 1997–98: Brett Colborne, D
 1999–00: Brian McCullough, F
 2000–01: Phil Osaer, G
 2002–03: Simon Mangos, D; Troy Milam, D; Jeff Legue, F
 2009–10: Zach Redmond, D
 2011–12: Jordie Johnston, F
 2012–13: Juho Olkinuora, G; Joey LaLeggia, D

CCHA All-Rookie Team

 1990–91: Pat Mazzoli, G
 1993–94: Andy Roach, D
 1994–95: Jason Blake, F
 1997–98: Kevin Swider, F
 2001–02: Mike Brown, G; Matt York, D
 2005–06: Dan Riedel, F
 2021–22: Bradley Marek, F

Olympians
Source:

This is a list of Ferris State alumni who played on an Olympic team.

Statistical leaders

Career points leaders
Source:

Career goaltending leaders
Source:

GP = Games played; Min = Minutes played; W = Wins; L = Losses; T = Ties; GA = Goals against; SO = Shutouts; SV% = Save percentage; GAA = Goals against average

Minimum 30 games

Statistics current through the start of the 2018–19 season.

Ferris State Athletic Hall of Fame
The following is a list of people associated with the Ferris State men's ice hockey program who were elected into the Ferris State Athletic Hall of Fame (induction date in parenthesis).

Jim Baker (2002)
John DePourcq (2002)
Paul Lowden (2003)
Jim File (2004)
Peter Lowden (2004)
Randy Merrifield (2005)
John Gruden (2007)
Andy Roach (2009)

Current roster 
As of September 5, 2022.

Bulldogs in the NHL
As of July 1, 2022.

Source:

References

External links

Ferris State Bulldogs men's ice hockey

 
Ice hockey teams in Michigan
1975 establishments in Michigan
Ice hockey clubs established in 1975
Ferris State Bulldogs men's ice hockey players